Hajjiabad (also Romanized as Ḩājjīābād) is a village in Sarbuk Rural District, Sarbuk District, Qasr-e Qand County, Sistan and Baluchestan Province, Iran. At the 2006 census, its population was 853, in 170 families.

References 

Populated places in Qasr-e Qand County